Karakuri Circus is a Japanese manga series written and illustrated by Kazuhiro Fujita. The 36-episode anime television series adaptation aired from October 11, 2018 to June 27, 2019 on Tokyo MX and BS11.

The series is animated by Studio VOLN and directed by Satoshi Nishimura, with Toshiki Inoue and Kazuhiro Fujita handling series composition, and Takahiro Yoshimatsu designing the characters. Yuki Hayashi is composing the series' music, and Twin Engine is producing the series. For the first 12 episodes, Bump of Chicken performed the series' opening theme song "Gekkō", and Lozareena performed the ending theme song "Marionette". From episodes 13-24, the second opening theme song is "Haguruma" performed by  KANA-BOON, and the series' second ending theme song "Yūdachi" is performed by Memai Siren. For the final 12 episodes, the third opening theme song is "Over me" performed by Lozareena, while the third ending is the previous first opening song "Gekkō" by Bump of Chicken. The series was simulcast exclusively on Amazon Video worldwide.

Episode list

Notes

References

External links
  
 

Karakuri Circus